The Princess Elizabeth Challenge Cup is a rowing event at Henley Royal Regatta open to school 1st VIIIs.

History
The event was instituted in 1946 for public schools in the United Kingdom.  It was opened to entries from overseas in 1964, and that year Washington-Lee High School (United States) became the first overseas crew to win the event, beating Groton School, USA, in an all-American final.

The inauguration of this race coincided with future queen Princess Elizabeth's first visit to the regatta, and so permission was given to name the trophy "The Princess Elizabeth Challenge Cup".

The PE (as it is usually abbreviated) is one of only a few races in the regatta which does not allow composite crews to be entered, and as such each race is a straight competition between one club and another. As the most prestigious race of the school rowing year, the event attracts strong competition both from the UK and abroad. For British crews, winning the PE can be the final victory needed to win “the triple", a prestigious achievement which comprises winning the Schools' Head of the River Race, The National Schools Regatta and finally the Princess Elizabeth Challenge Cup, all in the same year. The "triple" has been achieved three times in recent years by Eton College in 2005, 2009, and 2010 (and the "double" in 2021 as the Schools' Head of the River Race did not take place), twice by Abingdon School in 2002 and 2012, and by St Paul's School (London) in 2018. Both St Pauls and Eton have won the Youth Eights at the Head of the Charles Regatta whilst also winning the British domestic "triple." Eton, who won the HOCR and the triple in both 2008/09 and 2009/10 and St Paul's in 2017/18.

Eton College have won the PE a total of 15 times, St Paul's School (London) 7 times, Ridley College (Canada) 5 times, and Abingdon School, Bedford School, Hampton School, Pangbourne College, Shrewsbury School and St. Edward's School have each won the event 4 times.

Radley College are the most frequent losing finalists having done so on 7 occasions, followed by Eton College on 6 occasions and St Paul's School (London) on 5 occasions. Hampton School and St. Edward's School have been the losing finalists on 4 occasions. The King's School Canterbury shares the record with Oundle School  for most losses (4) in finals without having ever won the event.

The PE was opened to international crews in 1964, since when American crews have won the event 14 times (and been losing finalists 18 times), Canadian crews 7 times (losing finalists twice), and Australian crews 3 times (losing finalists twice).

Winners
See table below.

Record times
The record holder for the event is St Paul's School (London), having finished the course in 6 minutes 06 seconds in the final against Eton College in 2018. They beat the previous record for the event by 11 seconds, held by Abingdon School.

The course record times for the event are:

1:46 to the Barrier (St. Paul's School 2018)
2:58 to Fawley (St. Paul's School 2018)
6:06 to the Finish (St. Paul's School 2018)

Sources
 Henley Royal Regatta
 Henley finals results 1946 onwards

References 

Recurring sporting events established in 1946
Events at Henley Royal Regatta
Rowing trophies and awards
Scholastic rowing in the United Kingdom